Rebel is the third studio album by Christian rap artist, Lecrae. The album was released by Reach Records on September 30, 2008. The album was nominated in the best Rap/Hip-Hop Album category at the 40th Annual GMA Dove Awards but lost to Group 1 Crew's Ordinary Dreamers.

Background
Rebel is titled after Lecrae's encouragement to rebel against modern pop culture, also pointing out that Jesus Christ himself was a rebel. Lecrae has stated that the title of the album is both a noun and a verb. Rapzilla called the album "a verbal onslaught against the world's view on life in modern day culture."

Content
Lecrae tackles some important issues in Rebel. In the album's intro and title track, Lecrae says that Christians must rebel against the ways of the world.  In "Don't Waste Your Life" featuring Dwayne Tryumf, the rapper talks about how worldly pursuits lead to only disappointment in life, and living to serve Jesus leads to happiness. In the song "Identity" featuring J.R. and Da' T.R.U.T.H., Lecrae deals with self-esteem and image issues in the global community, telling listeners that their worth comes from their relationship with the Lord Jesus Christ and not in material possessions. "Indwelling Sin" speaks on the battle between his flesh and his  spirit in the form of a conversation with his sin. In "Fall Back" featuring Trip Lee, he speaks on guarding against the ideals of the world as portrayed in the media. In "Got Paper" he again attacks the perception that money is the ultimate goal in life and asserts that a relationship with Christ is greater than all of the riches of the world. In "The Bride", Lecrae exhorts listeners to love the church as Christ loves the church.

Reception

Commercial
Rebel has been a commercial success, having sold over 15,000 copies shortly after its release (9,800 copies in its first week and 5,600 copies in its second week of release, excluding digital downloads) and debuting on eight Billboard music charts. The album debuted at No 60 on the Billboard 200 albums chart and is the first Lecrae album to do so. Rebel also debuted at No 1 on the Top Gospel Albums chart, outperforming his previous album, After the Music Stops, which only managed to peak at No 5 throughout its 100-week run on the chart. The album remained at the No 1 spot on the Top Gospel Albums chart for a second week, and was the first hip hop album to ever reach No. 1 on the chart.  Rebel debuted at No 2 on Billboard'''s Top Christian Albums and Top Christian & Gospel Albums charts, respectively. The album secured the No 10 spot on the Top Independent Albums chart and held the No 15 spots equally on the Top Digital Albums and Top Internet Albums charts. Rebel also achieved a lower peak position of No 61 on the Billboard Comprehensive Albums chart.

According to the Nielsen SoundScan, a project specializing in the statistics of album sales, Rebel was the highest-selling Christian rap album in the weeks following its release. Rebel'' also maintained a six-week run on the iTunes Store's Top 10 most sold albums chart.

Track listing

Charts

Release history

Awards

The album was nominated for a Dove Award for Rap/Hip-Hop Album of the Year at the 40th GMA Dove Awards.

References

External links
Rebel lyrics at Reach Records
LecraeRebel.com

2008 albums
Lecrae albums
Reach Records albums
Albums produced by Lecrae
Albums produced by Gawvi